The PickUp is a free weekend-only nighttime shuttle bus service operating a single route along Santa Monica Boulevard in West Hollywood, California. First launched in 2013, it primarily serves passengers patronizing bars, clubs and other entertainment venues located along the Santa Monica corridor.

History
The PickUp was soft launched on August 9, 2013, with service formally commencing the following weekend. It was West Hollywood's second attempt at a running a nighttime shuttle bus service; the first attempt, which ran during the 1990s, failed due to low ridership.

Initially running along Santa Monica Boulevard between Robertson Boulevard and Fairfax Avenue as a trial service that would last until the end of the year, the city government of West Hollywood allocated $71,000 for the project, pitching it as a "flirtatious take on public transit". Ridership averaged between 1,300 and 1,400 riders per weekend in its first month, with ridership higher on Saturdays than Fridays, and averaging around 1,200 riders per weekend in its first year.

Owing to strong positive reception from riders, residents and businesses, in January 2014 the West Hollywood City Council voted to continue the service, and the following year it approved expanding The PickUp to its current service pattern, introducing limited Sunday and holiday service as well as extending the route to the eastern end of West Hollywood city limits. Permanent year-round Sunday service was subsequently introduced on October 2, 2016.

Operations and service pattern

The PickUp runs a single west-east route along Santa Monica Boulevard, starting at the intersection of Santa Monica Boulevard and La Brea Avenue. It then runs west, serving stops on the northern side of Santa Monica Boulevard until the last westbound stop on Ramage Street, where it then turns onto Almont Drive and Melrose Avenue before turning onto La Peer Drive and back again onto Santa Monica Boulevard where, traveling eastward, it then serves stops on the southern side. Buses run every 15 minutes from 8:00 pm to 3:00 am on Fridays and Saturdays, and from 2:00 pm to 10:00 pm on Sundays, complementing existing Los Angeles Metro bus service and giving riders additional transportation options.

Stops are identified with bright yellow signs, and are often located in front of bars, clubs and other entertainment venues. A number of prominent West Hollywood establishments are served with PickUp stops; these include Barney's Beanery, served by the stop at Santa Monica and Kings Road; The Abbey, served by the stop at Santa Monica and Robertson Boulevard; Circus of Books, served by the stop at Santa Monica and La Jolla Avenue; and the Pacific Design Center, served by the stop at Santa Monica and San Vicente Boulevard.

On April 1, 2020, the city government of West Hollywood announced that services on The PickUp would be suspended indefinitely owing to the COVID-19 pandemic in California. Service resumed on October 8, 2021, with passengers required to wear face masks and buses limited to fifty percent of maximum capacity to promote social distancing.

Fleet
The PickUp operates trolley-shaped buses manufactured by Freightliner Trucks which can sit up to 29 passengers at any one time, although the buses are certified for a maximum capacity of 35 passengers along with one space for a wheelchair. Operated by transport operator American GTS on behalf of the City of West Hollywood, buses are painted bright yellow, with pop art design elements reminiscent of the 1960s being part of the buses' design.

Buses are equipped with wooden benches, a photo booth called "The PickUp Shot" which can upload photos to social media, and a jar of complimentary condoms located by the driver's seat. Music curated by local DJ Derek Monteiro, described as being either house or ambient trance, is also played in the background for passengers.

Fares
Passengers may ride The PickUp free of charge, with the cost absorbed by the City of West Hollywood, although the city government has considered using corporate sponsorships to ensure continued funding for the service. In 2018, a passenger trip cost the city government around $6.50.

Aside from subsidizing fares, to help promote ridership a number of businesses along Santa Monica Boulevard offer discounts and other benefits for riders, including VIP entry, free food and discounts on drinks.

Reception and accolades
Public reception to The PickUp has been generally positive, with 93% of passengers reporting they were either satisfied or very satisfied with the service according to a 2018 city-commissioned survey of riders.

The city government of West Hollywood has been awarded a number of times for marketing campaigns related to The PickUp. In April 2014, the city was given the Excellence in Communications Award by the California Association of Public Information Officials for its marketing efforts in launching the service, and later that year the Los Angeles chapter of the Public Relations Society of America likewise awarded it the PRism Award of Excellence for its fresh approach to promoting public transit.

See also
Santa Monica Boulevard
List of Southern California transit agencies

References

External links
Official website of The PickUp

Public transportation in Los Angeles County, California
Bus transportation in California
West Hollywood, California